This is a list of places, buildings, roads and other things named after Queen Elizabeth II. It is divided by category, and each item's location is noted in the entry.

Awards and commemorative emblems

Former:  
United Kingdom: Queen's Young Leader Award

Geographic locations

Former: 

 Guyana: Queen Elizabeth II National Park
 Scotland: Queen Elizabeth Square, Glasgow

Structures

Buildings

Former:
 Hong Kong: Queen Elizabeth II Youth Centre
 New Zealand: QEII Army Memorial Museum, Waiouru
 United Kingdom: Queens Building, Heathrow Airport (built in 1953 and demolished in 2009)
 Queensland: Queen Elizabeth II Jubilee Sports Centre, Brisbane 
 England: QEII Pier, London

Hospitals and health

Monuments and sculptures

Former:
Canada: British Columbia: bust in Beacon Hill Park, Victoria, commemorating the royal visit of 1959 had its head completely removed from the body by vandals in February 2021

Roads, highways, bridges and footpaths

 Alderney: Queen Elizabeth II Street
 Australia: 
 Australian Capital Territory: Queen Elizabeth Terrace, Parkes, Canberra
 New South Wales: Queen Elizabeth Drive, Armidale
 Norfolk Island: Queen Elizabeth Avenue
 Bahamas: Queen Elizabeth Drive, Marsh Harbour, Abaco Islands
 Brazil: 
 Amazonas: Queen Elizabeth Way, Manaus
 British Virgin Islands: Queen Elizabeth II Bridge, between Beef Island and Tortola
 Brunei: Elizabeth II Street, Bandar Seri Begawan
 Canada: 
 Alberta: Princess Elizabeth Avenue, Edmonton
 Alberta: Queen Elizabeth II Highway, the portion of Alberta Highway 2 between Calgary and Edmonton
 Manitoba: Queen Elizabeth Avenue, Erickson 
 Manitoba: Queen Elizabeth Way, Winnipeg, in commemoration of the 2002 Royal Visit.
 Ontario: Queen Elizabeth Driveway, Ottawa
 Ontario: Queensway, Highway 417, Ottawa
 Ontario: [Queen Elizabeth Street, Lively (Greater City of Sudbury) 
 Quebec: Rue Élisabeth-II (Elizabeth II street) in Quebec City.
 Cayman Islands Queens Highway, East End, Grand Cayman Islands
 Ethiopia: Queen Elizabeth II Street, Addis Ababa, to commemorate the Queen's visit in 1965
 Fiji: Queen Elizabeth Drive
 Ghana: Elizabeth II Street, Prestea, Ocidental
 Jersey: L’Avenue de la Reine Elizabeth II
 Malaysia: 
 Perak: Queen's Street, Ipoh
 Sabah: Queen Elizabeth Street, Kota Kinabalu
 Malta: ( – Princess Elizabeth Street), Ta' Xbiex
 Mauritius: Queen Elizabeth II Avenue, Port Louis, Mauritius
 New Zealand: Queen Elizabeth II Drive, State Highway 74, Christchurch
 Nigeria: 
 Queen Elizabeth II Road, Ibadan
 Queen Elizabeth Street, Abuja
 Poland: Queen Elizabeth Street, Łańcut, Subcarpathian Voivodeship
 Singapore: Queen Elizabeth II Walk, Singapore, to commemorate the Queen's coronation in 1953
 Sri Lanka:
 Central Province: Queen Elizabeth Drive, Nuwara Eliya
 North Central Province: Queen Elizabeth II Street (Jaya Mawatha), Thambuththegama, to commemorate the Queen's visit in 1981
 Uganda: Queen's Way (Central Division, Kampala City) to commemorate the Queen's visit
 Ukraine: Queen Elizabeth Street ( – Vulitsya Korolevy Yelyzavety), Mukachevo, Zakarpattia Oblast
 United Kingdom: 
 England: Golden Jubilee Bridge, London
 England: Princess Elizabeth Way, Cheltenham, Gloucestershire
 England: Queen Elizabeth II Bridge,  part of the Dartford Crossing between Thurrock and Dartford
 England: Queen Elizabeth Road, Nuneaton, main boundary road for Camp Hill adjoining to Tuttle Hill and Bucks Hill
 England: Queen Elizabeth Bridge, A322 Windsor By-pass, Windsor
 England: Queen Elizabeth II Metro Bridge, Tyne and Wear Metro, between Newcastle upon Tyne and Gateshead
 England: Queen Elizabeth Walk, Barnes, London, to commemorate the Queen's coronation in 1953
 England: Queensway, Birmingham
 England: Queensway, Stevenage
 England: Queensway, Stoke-on-Trent
 England: Elizabeth Avenue, Abingdon-on-Thames, Oxfordshire, one of several named during her Silver Jubilee
 England: Elizabeth Avenue, Staines-upon-Thames, Surrey
 England: Elizabeth II Avenue, Berkhamsted, Hertfordshire
 England: Elizabeth Road, Purbrook, Hampshire
 England: Elizabeth Road, Stamford, Lincolnshire
 England: Elizabeth Way, Hilperton, Wiltshire
 Northern Ireland: Queen Elizabeth II Bridge, Belfast
 Northern Ireland: Queen Elizabeth Bridge, Enniskillen, built in 1954, across the River Erne
 Northern Ireland: Queen Elizabeth Road, Enniskillen, road which crosses the above bridge and runs alongside the Erne
 United States:
 California: Queen Elizabeth Drive, Atwater
 Texas: Queen Elizabeth Drive, Arlington
 Washington, D.C.: Queen's Stroll, Ward 7

Former:
 Iran: Elizabeth II Boulevard ( – Bolvār Elizābet Dovvom), Tehran, named to commemorate the Queen's visit in 1961, renamed Keshavarz Boulevard ( – Bolvār e Keshāvarz) in 1979.

Schools

Other

Former:
United Kingdom: Class 91 91029 Queen Elizabeth II. The railway locomotive was named by the Queen in person in March 1991. It lost its nameplate in the late 1990s when GNER was founded, was renumbered in 2000, withdrawn in 2020 and finally scrapped the following year
The Queen Elizabeth II Fields Challenge: a programme run by Fields in Trust aiming to protect outdoor recreational spaces across the UK to create a "grassroots legacy" in celebration of the 2012 Diamond Jubilee

References

See also
 List of titles and honours of Elizabeth II
 Royal eponyms in Canada

Things named after
British monarchy-related lists
Lists of things named after people